Owanka may refer to:

Owanka, Minnesota, unincorporated community, United States
Owanka, South Dakota, unincorporated community, United States